"Changin' Partners" is a song written by Larry Gatlin, and recorded by American country music group Larry Gatlin & the Gatlin Brothers.  It was released in August 1987 as the fourth single from the album Partners.  The song reached number 16 on the Billboard Hot Country Singles & Tracks chart.

Chart performance

References

1987 singles
1986 songs
Larry Gatlin songs
Columbia Records singles
Songs written by Larry Gatlin